West is an unincorporated community in Wetzel County, in the U.S. state of West Virginia.

History
A post office called West was established in 1864, and remained in operation until 1953. The origin of the name West is obscure; it might be named after the local West family.

References

Unincorporated communities in Wetzel County, West Virginia
Unincorporated communities in West Virginia